Äigrumäe is a village in Viimsi Parish, Harju County in northern Estonia.

Äigrumäe is reachable from the centre of Tallinn by Tallinn Bus Company's route no. 8 (Viru keskus – Äigrumäe) with an average traveling time of 25 minutes, and also by less frequent route no. 38 (Viru keskus – Muuga).

References

Villages in Harju County